Xilin MRT station is a future underground Mass Rapid Transit station on the Downtown line in Tampines planning area, Singapore. Taking its name from Xilin Avenue which passes overhead, Xilin station serves industries around Changi South, as well as the nearby Tanah Merah Country Club. The station is located at the junction of Xilin Avenue, Changi South Avenue 3 and Laguna Golf Green.

History
The extension to the Downtown MRT line was first announced during the revealing of the Land Transport Master Plan 2013 on 17 January 2013. The line will be extended to what was known as the Eastern Region line (presently the Thomson–East Coast MRT line) by 2025, so as to enhance the accessibility between the two rail lines and allow commuters to conveniently make transfers.

This station was first announced on 15 August 2014 as part of the Downtown line stage 3e, consisting of 2 stations between Xilin and Sungei Bedok, and is expected to be completed in 2024, in tandem with the adjacent East Coast Integrated Depot.

Contract T313 for the design and construction of Xilin Station and associated tunnels was awarded to Samsung C&T Corporation at a sum of S$834 million on 21 March 2016. Construction started in 2016, with completion in 2024.

To facilitate the construction for the Downtown line 3 Extension Xilin station and tunnels, part of Changi South Avenue 3 between Xilin Avenue and Changi South Avenue 2 will be temporarily closed to traffic from 31 January 2017 until the end of construction in 2024.

References

External links

Proposed railway stations in Singapore
Mass Rapid Transit (Singapore) stations
Railway stations scheduled to open in 2024